Nova Scotia Trunk 7 is part of the Canadian province of Nova Scotia's system of Trunk Highways. Part of Trunk 7 is known as the Marine Drive.

Route description

Dartmouth
From Bedford at the intersection of Trunk 2, Trunk 7 leaves to the southeast along the eastern shore of the Bedford Basin, then climbs Magazine Hill next to the Canadian Forces Magazine and enters Dartmouth on Windmill Road. Through Downtown Dartmouth, it is known as Alderney Drive, which turns into Prince Albert Road past Sullivan's Pond as it runs along the shore of Lake Banook. At Grahams Grove Park, Trunk 7 continues through the Micmac Parclo, on to Main Street, past Highway 111 and to the community of Westphal, bypassing Cole Harbour to the south. Until 1970, Highway 7 ran from Portland Street to Prince Albert Road.

Eastern Shore
Just outside Dartmouth, three highways head towards the Eastern Shore: Route 207 leads out of Cole Harbour, passing the surfing beach at Lawrencetown. Near Preston, Route 107 and Trunk 7 separate. Highway 107 and Trunk 7 continue eastward through the African Canadian community of East Preston and the exurban communities of Lake Echo, Porters Lake and Head of Chezzetcook to Musquodoboit Harbour, where Highway 107 ends.

Trunk 7 continues to the east, twisting along numerous inlets of the Atlantic Ocean past some of the longest beaches in the province and through almost 300 coastal communities, such as Head of Jeddore, Sheet Harbour, Moser River, Necum Teuch and Ecum Secum. There are two junctions in Sheet Harbour with Route 224 and Route 374. Trunk 7 continues along the coast, passing through Port Dufferin and Moser River. In Ecum Secum, Trunk 7 crosses into Guysborough County. In Sherbrooke, Trunk 7 crosses the St. Mary's River and turns north, away from the ocean. The route follows the east bank of the river's valley, passing  through Melrose and Aspen. In Lochaber, Trunk 7 crosses into Antigonish County. Trunk 7 then continues north through Salt Springs to its end at Antigonish, where it crosses Highway 104, part of the Trans-Canada Highway network, then terminates at West Street/Trunk 4 in Antigonish.

Major intersections

References

007
007
007
007
Antigonish, Nova Scotia